The Womack Family Band is an Americana music quartet from Norwalk, Ohio. The group consists of Haley Heyman (guitar, mandolin, keyboards, vocals), Noah Heyman (guitar, mandolin, bass guitar, banjo, vocals), Tony Schaffer (piano, guitar, bass guitar, alto saxophone, trumpet, clarinet, vocals), and Cory Webb (drums). The Womacks unique and varied sound is attributed to the group's three distinct songwriters, which allows a new lyrical perspective with each song.

Formation and band name
The members of The Womack Family Band gradually came together around multi-instrumentalist Tony Schaffer, who had been performing with Americana Singer-Songwriter and fellow Ohioan Chris Castle. Schaffer and Noah Heyman started performing together as an acoustic duo in 2008, adding vocalist Haley Heyman to the line-up within six months. That same year, the trio became the featured weekly act at the Office Bar in Norwalk, Ohio, where they met bartender and drummer Cory Webb. The Womack name was meant to be a tongue-in-cheek nod to fans of singer-songwriter Tommy Womack and was initially coined by Schaffer and Castle as a bar-band alias. The name was changed to "Womack Family Band" after Haley joined the group. The name stuck, and was used as the title for the Womacks' 2010 debut.

Debut album
Folk Alley named The Womack Family Band their featured artists of July 2010. The group released their self-titled debut disc on September 15 of the same year, at the Winchester Music Hall (Lakewood, OH). The debut record consisted of 15 songs, written by Noah and Haley Heyman, and Tony Schaffer, the group's three primary songwriters, and included songs like "When The Winter Breaks", "Hold On", "Bloodline Blues", and "Sisyphus' Stone".

"From Chestnut" EP
The Womack Family Band's next release was an EP titled "From Chestnut". The entire disc was, like the debut, recorded entirely in the Womacks home studio on Chestnut Street. The collection was released in September 2011 and included songs like "Sara", "Sugar Honey", and "Nothing".

References

Americana music groups
Musical quartets
People from Norwalk, Ohio
Musical groups established in 2008